Nothanillus is a genus of ground beetles in the family Carabidae. There are at least two described species in Nothanillus, found in Chile.

Species
These two species belong to the genus Nothanillus:
 Nothanillus germaini Jeannel, 1962
 Nothanillus luisae Bonniard de Saludo, 1970

References

Trechinae
Endemic fauna of Chile